Ancistrus triradiatus is a species of catfish in the family Loricariidae. It is native to South America, where it is known from the drainage basins of the Orinoco, the Los Guayos River, Lake Valencia, and Lake Maracaibo. The species reaches 9.2 cm (3.6 inches) SL. It sometimes appears in the aquarium trade, where it is known as the gold-spot or three-ray bristlenose pleco.

References 

triradiatus
Fish described in 1918